Forgive Them Father may refer to:

 "Forgive Them Father", a 1995 song by Shaggy from Boombastic
 "Forgive Them Father", a 1998 song by Lauryn Hill from The Miseducation of Lauryn Hill